Stephen Harris (born 1968 in Shifnal) is an English music producer and mixer. He has worked with artists including Dave Matthews Band, Ben Kweller, The Wombats, Kula Shaker, Kodaline, Kaiser Chiefs and The Automatic. He is also known for having Mix engineered "Beautiful Day" and "Sweetest Thing" by U2.

Partial discography
Harris has been involved in the production of the following albums:
Kodaline – Politics Of Living
Kodaline – Coming Up For Air
The Dunwells – Light Up The Sky
Kodaline – In A Perfect World
Miles Kane – Don't Forget Who You Are
Ben Kweller – Sha Sha
Longpigs – The Sun Is Often Out
Dave Matthews Band – Busted Stuff
Dave Matthews – Some Devil
Kula Shaker – K
Blue Merle – Burning In The Sun
The Twang – Jewellery Quarter
The Wombats – The Wombats Proudly Present: A Guide to Love, Loss & Desperation 
The Academy Is – Fast Times at Barrington High
Santana – Supernatural
The Kaiser Chiefs – Employment
Hey Monday – Hold On Tight
Aqualung – Still Life
The Automatic – Not Excepted Anywhere & This Is A Fix
Pull Tiger Tail – PAWS.
Straw - Shoplifting

References

1968 births
Living people
English record producers
People from Shifnal